The roosterfish, Nematistius pectoralis, is a game fish found in the warmer waters of the East Pacific from Baja California to Peru. It is the only species in the genus Nematistius and the family Nematistiidae. It is distinguished by its "rooster comb", seven very long spines of the dorsal fin.

The roosterfish has an unusual arrangement of its ears: the swim bladder penetrates the brain through the large foramina and makes contact with the inner ear. It uses its swim bladder to amplify sounds.

The fish is popular as a game fish, but it is not considered a good eating fish. Catch and release is strongly recommended.

References

External links
 Visual Identification

 
Carangiformes
Fish described in 1862